The 2020 Kansas Lottery 250 was a NASCAR Xfinity Series race held on July 25, 2020 at Kansas Speedway in Kansas City, Kansas. Contested over 175 laps – extended from 167 due to a double overtime finish – on the  asphalt speedway, it was the 17th race of the 2020 NASCAR Xfinity Series season. Brandon Jones won his second race of the season.

The Kansas Lottery 250 replaced Iowa Speedway's second date for the 2020 Xfinity Series season due to the COVID-19 pandemic.

Report

Background 

Kansas Speedway is a 1.5-mile (2.4 km) tri-oval race track in Kansas City, Kansas. It was built in 2001, and it currently hosts two annual NASCAR race weekends. The IndyCar Series also held races at the venue until 2011. The speedway is owned and operated by the International Speedway Corporation.

The race was held without fans in attendance due to the ongoing COVID-19 pandemic.

Entry list 

 (R) denotes rookie driver.
 (i) denotes driver who is ineligible for series driver points.

Qualifying 
Michael Annett was awarded the pole for the race as determined by a random draw.

Starting Lineup 

 The No. 44 of Tommy Joe Martins had to start from the rear due to unapproved adjustments.

Race

Race results

Stage Results 
Stage One

Laps: 40

Stage Two

Laps: 40

Final Stage Results 
Laps: 87

Race statistics 

 Lead changes: 9 among 5 different drivers
 Cautions/Laps: 5 for 22
 Red flags: 0
 Time of race: 2 hours, 4 minutes, 37 seconds
 Average speed:

Media

Television 
The Kansas Lottery 250 was carried by NBCSN in the United States. Rick Allen, Steve Letarte, and Jeff Burton called the race from the booth at Charlotte Motor Speedway, with Parker Kligerman and Kelli Stavast covering pit road. Jesse Iwuji served as a driver analyst on pit road.

Radio 
The Motor Racing Network (MRN) called the race for radio, which was simulcast on SiriusXM NASCAR Radio.

Standings after the race 

 Drivers' Championship standings

 Note: Only the first 12 positions are included for the driver standings.
 . – Driver has clinched a position in the NASCAR playoffs.

References 

2020 NASCAR Xfinity Series
Kansas Lottery 250
2020 in sports in Kansas
NASCAR races at Kansas Speedway